The 1962 Georgia Bulldogs football team represented the Georgia Bulldogs of the University of Georgia during the 1962 NCAA University Division football season. The Bulldogs completed the season with a 3–4–3 record.

Schedule

References

Georgia
Georgia Bulldogs football seasons
Georgia Bulldogs football